D.C. (District of Columbia) Black Pride is the first official black gay pride event in the United States and one of two officially recognized festivals for the African-American LGBT community. It is a program of the Center for Black Equity (CBE) and is also affiliated with the Capital Pride Alliance. DC Black Pride is held annually on Memorial Day weekend.

History 
Washington, D.C. had long been a popular destination for black LGBT people as a result of its large black LGBT community and progressive reputation. Since 1978, DC has been home to the nation's first black LGBT political advocacy group called the D.C. Coalition of Black Lesbians, Gays and Bisexuals.

The first DC Black Pride was created by Welmore Cook, Theodore Kirkland, and Ernest Hopkins in collaboration with the DC Coalition of Black Lesbians and Gay Men and the Inner City AIDS Network. Planning was done over about three months. It was held in May 1991 as "Let's All Come Together, Black Lesbian and Gay Pride Day". The event focused on raising funds for HIV/AIDS organizations serving the local LGBT African-American community. About 800 people attended.

In 1992 the event, now run by the nonprofit "Black Lesbian & Gay Pride Day, Inc." (BLGPD), spanned over multiple days. Events included the first Washington screening of Marlon Riggs' film Tongues United.

The success of the event inspired the creation of elaborate annual official black pride events in other major cities across the country. Annually, over 40,000 is expected which establishes it as the second largest black pride festival in the world.

In 2018 a documentary about the event's history, DC Black Pride: Answering the Call, was premiered over Memorial Day weekend.

The event was not held in 2020 or 2021 due to the COVID-19 pandemic, but it returned in-person in 2022.

See also
Capital Pride (Washington, D.C.)
Gay Men's Chorus of Washington, D.C.
Ball culture
Black gay pride
Atlanta Black Pride
UK Black Pride

External links 

 Official Website
 DC Black Pride: Answering the Call

References

External links
Official website
DC Black Pride History

1991 establishments in Washington, D.C.
African-American history of Washington, D.C.
African-American LGBT organizations
LGBT African-American culture
LGBT culture in Washington, D.C.

LGBT festivals in the United States